The 2018 North Carolina Education Lottery 200 was the 7th stock car race of the 2018 NASCAR Camping World Truck Series season, and the 16th iteration of the event. The race was held on Friday, May 18, 2018 in Concord, North Carolina at Charlotte Motor Speedway, a  tri-oval permanent racetrack. The race took the scheduled 134 laps to complete. Johnny Sauter of GMS Racing would dominate the race and win the race, the 20th of his career and the 2nd of the season. To fill the podium, Kyle Busch and Brandon Jones, both from Kyle Busch Motorsports would finish 2nd and 3rd, respectively.

Background 

The race was held at Charlotte Motor Speedway, located in Concord, North Carolina. The speedway complex includes a 1.5-mile (2.4 km) quad-oval track that was utilized for the race, as well as a dragstrip and a dirt track. The speedway was built in 1959 by Bruton Smith and is considered the home track for NASCAR with many race teams based in the Charlotte metropolitan area. The track is owned and operated by Speedway Motorsports Inc. (SMI) with Marcus G. Smith serving as track president.

Entry list

Practice

First practice 
First practice was held on Friday, May 18, at 9:05 AM EST.

Austin Wayne Self of Niece Motorsports would hit the wall in the opening minutes of practice, forcing him to go to a backup truck.

Second and final practice 
Second and final practice was held on Friday, May 18, at 10:35 AM EST.

Starting lineup 
Qualifying was meant to be held on Friday, May 18, but rain would force the cancellation of qualifying. As a result, the starting lineup was determined by owner's points. Johnny Sauter of GMS Racing would end up winning the pole for the race.

Due to the cancellation, Korbin Forrister, Timothy Peters, and Bo LeMastus would all not qualify for the race.

Race results 
Stage 1 Laps: 40

Stage 2 Laps: 40

Stage 3 Laps: 54

References 

2018 NASCAR Camping World Truck Series
NASCAR races at Charlotte Motor Speedway
May 2018 sports events in the United States
2018 in sports in North Carolina